Ignacio Tapia Bustamante (born 22 February 1999) is a Chilean footballer who plays as a defender for Chilean Primera División side Universidad de Chile.

International career
At under-20 level, Tapia represented Chile in the 2018 South American Games, winning the gold medal,

Tapia was called up to the Chile senior squad for the first time in June 2017, and was an unused substitute in a 3–0 win over Burkina Faso.

Career statistics

Club

Notes

Honours
Chile U20
 South American Games Gold medal: 2018

References

External links

1999 births
Living people
Chilean footballers
Chile under-20 international footballers
Association football defenders
C.D. Huachipato footballers
Universidad de Chile footballers
Chilean Primera División players
South American Games gold medalists for Chile
South American Games medalists in football
Competitors at the 2018 South American Games
21st-century Chilean people